A special election for one judge of the International Criminal Court was held during the 12th session of the Assembly of States Parties to the Rome Statute of the International Criminal Court which took place in The Hague from 20 to 28 November 2013.

The election became necessary after one judge elected in the 2011 election was unavailable: Anthony Carmona had been elected President of Trinidad and Tobago and had resigned from the bench on 18 March 2013.

Geoffrey A. Henderson, also from Trinidad and Tobago, was elected in the first ballot after his only opponent had withdrawn.

Background 
The judge elected at this election was chosen to complete the term, until 10 March 2021, of the judge he replaces.

The election is governed by the Rome Statute of the International Criminal Court. Its article 36(8)(a) states that "[t]he States Parties shall, in the selection of judges, take into account the need, within the membership of the Court, for:
 (i) The representation of the principal legal systems of the world;
 (ii) Equitable geographical representation; and
 (iii) A fair representation of female and male judges."

Furthermore, article 36(3)(b) and 36(5) provide for two lists:
 List A contains those judges that "[h]ave established competence in criminal law and procedure, and the necessary relevant experience, whether as judge, prosecutor, advocate or in other similar capacity, in criminal proceedings";
 List B contains those who "[h]ave established competence in relevant areas of international law such as international humanitarian law and the law of human rights, and extensive experience in a professional legal capacity which is of relevance to the judicial work of the Court".

Each candidate must belong to exactly one list.

Further rules of election were adopted by a resolution of the Assembly of States Parties in 2004.

Nomination process 
Following these rules, the nomination period of judges for the 2013 special election was scheduled to last from 28 August to 8 October 2013 and could have been extended up to three times if there had been a lack of candidates from a group for which a minimum voting requirement is in place. As of 13 October, the following persons were nominated:

Minimum voting requirements 
Minimum voting requirements governed part of the election. This was to ensure that article 36(8)(a) cited above is fulfilled. For this election, the following minimum voting requirements existed; they could have been adjusted once the election was underway.

Regarding the List A or B requirement, there was no minimum voting requirement.

Regarding the regional criteria, there was a voting requirement for one judge from the Latin American and Caribbean States.

Regarding the gender criteria, there was no minimum voting requirement.

The regional criterion could have been adjusted even before the election depending on the number of candidates. Paragraph 20(b) of the ASP resolution that governed the elections states that if there are less than double the number of candidates required for each region, the minimum voting requirement shall be a (rounded-up) half of the number of candidates; except when there is only one candidate which results in no voting requirement. 

The regional criterion could have been dropped if after four ballots the seat had not been filled.

The voting requirements were as follows:

Ballots 
Before the ballot, Leslie van Rompaey was withdrawn.

The ballot took place on 23 November 2013. The voting totals were as follows:

References

 2013
2013 elections
Non-partisan elections
2013